Hat Mountain is a mountain located in the Warner Mountains south of Eagle Peak in California. Lost Lake is located to the northwest of the summit.
Most of the precipitation that falls on Hat Mountain is snow due to the high elevation.

See also 
 List of highest points in California by county

References

Mountains of Lassen County, California
Mountains of Northern California